Francisco Javier Aguilar García (26 March 1949 – 11 May 2020) was a Spanish professional footballer who played as a forward.

Club career
Born in Santander, Aguilar started his career with local Racing de Santander, making his senior debut at 19 and helping the Cantabrians to achieve promotion to the Segunda División in 1970. The following year, he signed with La Liga powerhouse Real Madrid alongside teammate Santillana, finishing his first season with 31 matches (28 starts) and six goals as the team won the national championship; he added three in only four appearances in the UEFA Cup, but they were eliminated in the second round.

Safe for two seasons, Aguilar was regularly used during his spell, winning five leagues and two Copa del Rey – including the double in the 1974–75 campaign – and appearing in 190 competitive games. In the summer of 1979 he joined Sporting de Gijón, playing regularly but only managing to score on six occasions during his spell.

Aguilar retired from football in June 1983 at the age of 34, after two years with another club in Madrid, second-tier Rayo Vallecano (12 goals from 36 appearances in his first). Over ten seasons, he amassed top-flight totals of 190 matches and 40 goals.

International career
In one year and a half, Aguilar played three matches for Spain. He made his debut on 24 November 1971 in a UEFA Euro 1972 qualifier against Cyprus in Granada, replacing Real Madrid teammate Amancio Amaro at half-time and scoring the fifth goal in an eventual 7–0 rout.

Death
Aguilar died on 11 May 2020 in Madrid aged 71, due to cancer.

References

External links

Madridista stats 

1949 births
2020 deaths
Spanish footballers
Footballers from Santander, Spain
Association football forwards
La Liga players
Segunda División players
Tercera División players
Racing de Santander players
Real Madrid CF players
Sporting de Gijón players
Rayo Vallecano players
Spain under-23 international footballers
Spain international footballers
Spanish football managers
Segunda División B managers
CD Logroñés managers
Deaths from cancer in Spain